Aurora Gonin Musume (オーロラ5人娘, Aurora's five daughters) was a short-lived J-Pop group, that made their debut on 7 April 1993 with the single "Cool Love" (クールな恋).  The group's  members were Chiemi Chiba, Reiko Chiba, Ichiko Hashimoto, Maki Yamashita and Reiko Yamashita.

 (born 19--) is a Japanese J-Pop singer and was a member of this J-Pop group. She made her singing debut on 7 April 1993.

Japanese pop music groups